Shaun Wilson (born December 2, 1995) is an American football running back who is a free agent. He was most recently a member of the Saskatchewan Roughriders of the Canadian Football League (CFL). He played college football at Duke and signed with the Tampa Bay Buccaneers as an undrafted free agent in 2018. Wilson has also been a member of the Tampa Bay Buccaneers, Washington Redskins, and Tennessee Titans.

Early years
Wilson attended and played high school football at West Mecklenburg High School.

College career
Wilson attended and played college football at Duke.

Collegiate statistics

Professional career

Tampa Bay Buccaneers
Wilson was signed to the Tampa Bay Buccaneers as an undrafted free agent on April 30, 2018. Wilson made his NFL debut in the 2018 season opener against the New Orleans Saints. In the 48–40 victory, he had a six-yard rush and a 29-yard kick return. He was placed on injured reserve on November 13, 2018 after suffering a shoulder injury in Week 10. He finished his rookie season with six carries for 29 rushing yards. On June 21, 2019, Wilson was waived by the Buccaneers.

Washington Redskins
On July 25, 2019, Wilson was signed by the Washington Redskins. He was placed on injured reserve on September 1, 2019. He was waived from injured reserve on November 1, 2019.

Tennessee Titans
On December 24, 2019, Wilson was signed to the Tennessee Titans practice squad. He signed a reserve/future contract with the Titans on January 20, 2020. He was waived with a non-football injury designation on July 26, 2020.

Saskatchewan Roughriders 
On August 29, 2022, Wilson signed with the Saskatchewan Roughriders of the Canadian Football League (CFL). He was released by the Riders in late October having never dressed for a game.

References

External links
Tampa Bay Buccaneers bio
Duke Blue Devils bio

1995 births
Living people
Players of American football from Charlotte, North Carolina
American football running backs
Duke Blue Devils football players
Tampa Bay Buccaneers players
Washington Redskins players
Tennessee Titans players